Ahmedabad Smash Masters was a badminton team owned by Padmanabh Sports Pvt. Ltd. for the Premier Badminton League (PBL). The team's home ground was The Arena by TransStadia, Ahmedabad. In the 2017-18 season, the team was captained by Indian badminton player H.S. Prannoy, and coached by Madhumita Bisht. In the 2018-19 season, the team was captained by Viktor Axelsen from Denmark.  The team was folded after 4th season due to financial issues.

History 
The team's first season in the PBL was in 2017. The Badminton team was owned by Padmanabh Sports Private Limited.

Ahmedabad Smash Masters was folded and had their license cancelled after 4th Season because they failed to fulfill their financial obligations.

2017-2018 squad

Indian players
  H.S. Prannoy (Captain)
  K. Nandagopal
  Siril Verma
  Sourabh Verma
  Sri Krishna Priya Kudaravalli

Foreign players
  Kamilla Rytter Juhl
  Law Cheuk Him
  Reginald Lee Chun Hei
  Stefani Stoeva
  Tai Tzu Ying

2018-2019 squad

Indian players
  Anoushka Parikh
  N. Sikki Reddy
  Satwiksairaj Rankireddy
  K. Nandagopal
  Vaishnavi Bhale
  Sourabh Varma

Foreign players
  Viktor Axelsen (Captain)
  Reginald Lee Chun Hei
  Kirsty Gilmour
  Liew Daren

References

Premier Badminton League teams
Sport in Ahmedabad